American Christian Academy is a private Christian school located in Tuscaloosa, Alabama, United States, with students in grades PK-12.  It operates in the former Eastwood Middle School on Veterans Memorial Parkway, which it purchased from the Tuscaloosa City School Board. ACA has been a fully accredited school since 1990.

Demographics
The demographic breakdown of the 893 K-12 students enrolled in 2019-20 was:
Asian - 1.5%
Black - 3.7%
Hispanic - 2.1%
White - 92.4%
Multiracial - 0.3%

Athletics
The American Christian Academy Patriots compete as a private school in the Alabama High School Athletic Association (AHSAA). School colors are red, white and royal blue. The following AHSAA sanctioned sports are offered:

Baseball (boys) 
State champion - 2009, 2011
Basketball (boys and girls) 
Cross country (boys) 
State champion - 2015, 2016, 2017, 2020
Football (boys) 
Soccer (boys and girls) 
Softball (girls) 
Tennis (boys and girls) 
Volleyball (girls) 
Wrestling (boys) 

In addition, the Patriots were girls state champions in indoor track 2015-18 and boys indoor track 2017-18 In outdoor track, the girls were state champions 2007-2012, 2015, 2017 and 2018 and the boys were state champions in 2017 an 2018.

Notable alumni
Chris Smelley - college athlete

References

External links

Christian schools in Alabama
High schools in Tuscaloosa, Alabama
Private K-12 schools in Alabama